Anna Barsukova may refer to:
 Anna Barsukova (filmmaker) (born 1981), Russian film director
 Anna Barsukova (model) (born 1988), Russian entrepreneur and fashion model